Jacques Bidet (born 1935) is a French philosopher and social theorist who is currently professor emeritus in the Philosophy Department at the Université de Paris X - Nanterre.

His works are mainly devoted to the construction of a theory of modern society under the name of Meta/structural theory. Modern nation-states, as elements of world system, are structured on both market and organisation, supposedly rational mediations, as co-implied class factors. The philosophical, sociological, historical, legal-political and cultural aspects of this paradigm are developed in the sense of an Altermarxism, by contrast with classical Marxism.

In 1989, he founded with Jacques Texier the journal Actuel Marx (Presses Universitaires de France), and in 1995, the Congrès Marx International (Université de Paris X - Nanterre).

Publications

French
 , Klincksieck. 1985, 2° édition, PUF, 2000, 300 pp. Croatian, Japanese and Korean editions
 Bidet, J. (1990).  (Paris: PUF) 300 pp. Appeared in Spanish, Buenos Aires, Bellas Letras, 1993, in Italian, Roma, Laterza, 1993.
 Bidet, J. (1995).  (Paris: PUF) 140 pp.
 Bidet, J. (1999).  (Paris: PUF) 504 pp., Croatian edition (Disput, 2008, a revised shorter edition in 300 pp.), Chinese edition (Remnin Press, 2009).
 (ed. with Eustache Kouvelakis) , PUF, 2001, 600 pp. Chinese edition (Remnin Press).
 Bidet, J. (2004).  (Paris: PUF) 320 pp. . Appeared in Spanish (LOM, Santiago, Chile) 2006, in Italian (Manifesto Libri, 2010), in Brazilian (EditoraUnicamp, 2010). To appear in Chinese (Social Science Academic Press).
 Bidet, J. and Duménil, G. (2007).  (Paris: PUF) 300 pp. [Altermarxism, Another Marxism for another World]. Appeared in Spanish (Viejo Topo, 2009), in Polish (Dialog 2011), to appear in Chinese (Social Science Academic Press) and Korean.
 Bidet, J. (2011).  (Paris: PUF) 320 p.
 Bidet, J. (2014).  (Paris: La fabrique)

English
 Bidet, J. (1990). A Theory of Modernity
 Bidet, J. (1995). John Rawls and the Theory of Justice
 Bidet, J. (1999). A General Theory of Modernity
 Bidet, J. (2004). Explanation and Reconstruction of Capital
 Bidet, J. (2006). Exploring Marx’s Capital (Boston: Leyden)
 Bidet, J. and Duménil, G. (2007). Altermarxism: Another Marxism for Another World
 Bidet, J. (2007). Critical Companion of Contemporary Marxism (Boston: Leyden)
 Bidet, J. (2011). World State, Liberalism, Socialism, and Communism at Global Scale: A Refoundation of Marxism
 Bidet, J. (2016). Foucault with Marx (London: Zed Books), trans. Steven Corcoran

Other translations
 Bidet, J. (2000 [1995]). John Rawls y la Teoría de la justicia Spanish edition (Barcelona)

External links
 official website
 http://hrcak.srce.hr/index.php?show=clanak&id_clanak_jezik=99397 - short overview of innovative and constructive critique of Bidet"s approach towards reading and understanding Marx"s Capital by professor D.Strpic

1935 births
Living people
Academic staff of the University of Paris
French political philosophers
Marxist theorists
20th-century French philosophers
21st-century French philosophers
21st-century French writers
French male writers